Wayne Taylor (born 15 July 1956) is a South African sports car racing driver and team owner. He won the 1996 and 2005 24 Hours of Daytona, and the 2005 Grand-Am Rolex Sports Car Series Daytona Prototype drivers' championship. He drove for SunTrust Racing with Max Angelelli. He co-drove in the 2006 International Race of Champions in the United States with Angelelli. Taylor now owns and manages his own team competing in the WeatherTech SportsCar Championship.

Racing career
He won the 1986 South African National Drivers Championship. In 1987 he finished fourth in the 24 Hours of Le Mans. He moved to the FIA World Sportscar Championship. He competed in the C2 class in 1988, and moved to the C1 class in 1989. He also competed in the IMSA Camel GT series from 1989 through 1993. From 1991 through 1993, he was one of the lead drivers for the Intrepid RM-1 GTP program.

He won the IMSA WSC class in 1994, with second-place finishes in the 24 Hours of Daytona and the 12 Hours of Sebring.
Taylor won the 1996 24 hours of Daytona and 1996 12 hours of Sebring with Scott Sharp and Jim Pace (racing driver) in a Riley & Scott Mk III Oldsmobile.

He was once more IMSA WSC champion in 1995, 1996, 1997, and 1998. In 1998 he won the Petit Le Mans and the prototype class in the 24 Hours of Daytona.

He competed in the American Le Mans Series in 1999. From 2000 to 2002, he was a central part of the Cadillac Le Mans effort. It was handled by his long-time technical partner in 2000 Bob Riley before the chassis program was moved in England and an updated car was built for 2001, followed by a completely new car, the LMP-02, in 2002. Unfortunately, it was not successful against Audi's R8 and even privately entered LMPs, so GM discontinued the program at the end of the year. Taylor tried to secure funding to run a privateer effort with the car, but instead eventually continued with Cadillac in the Speed World Challenge CTS-V effort.

With Max Angelelli, he was co-champion in the Daytona Prototype category of the 2005 Grand American Road Racing Association Rolex Sports Car Series, and the pair also took the overall win in the 24 Hours of Daytona.

In 2006, Wayne and his Grand-Am teammate, Max Angelelli made IROC Series history becoming the first tandem of drivers to compete in one car during an IROC season.  They each raced two races and points were combined for their tally as they are in the sportscar series.

In mid-2006, Taylor announced a split with car builder Bob Riley and formed Wayne Taylor Racing for the 2007 season with continued backing from SunTrust, and Angelelli as co-driver. The team is based in Indianapolis. Early in 2007, Taylor stepped away from full-time driving and used a host of fill in drivers before naming Michael Valiante to team up with Angelelli full-time in 2008. Taylor continues to drive in the long distance events. The team continued to field Riley Chassis in 2007 before switching to the new Dallara chassis after the 2008 24 Hours of Daytona. In May 2008, the team's transporter caught fire and destroyed it, the new Dallara and all of their equipment. The team fielded their old Riley with borrowed equipment until a new Dallara could be built and shipped to the US. On 23 August, the team scored their first win of the year and the first for Dallara in Grand-Am at Infineon Raceway California.

Taylor's team won its second Grand-Am championship in 2013 with Angelelli co-driving with his son Jordan Taylor.  Wayne's older son Ricky Taylor is also a Grand-Am regular and was Angelelli's regular teammate until Jordan replaced him in 2013.

Motorsports career results

24 Hours of Le Mans results

WeatherTech SportsCar Championship results
(key)(Races in bold indicate pole position, Results are overall/class)

International Race of Champions
(key) (Bold – Pole position. * – Most laps led.)

 Ride shared with Max Angelelli

References

Racing profile 

1956 births
Living people
South African racing drivers
International Race of Champions drivers
Rolex Sports Car Series drivers
International Formula 3000 drivers
24 Hours of Le Mans drivers
Sportspeople from Port Elizabeth
24 Hours of Daytona drivers
American Le Mans Series drivers
Alumni of Selborne College
World Sportscar Championship drivers
WeatherTech SportsCar Championship drivers
12 Hours of Sebring drivers
Sports car racing team owners
IMSA GTP Championship drivers
IMSA GT Championship drivers
Nismo drivers
DAMS drivers
Wayne Taylor Racing drivers